Angola Cables is an Angolan multinational telecommunications operator of fiber-optic telecommunication cables.

The company was formed in 2009 and is owned by the major national telecommunication companies, namely Angola Telecom with 51% of the capital,  Unitel with 31%, MSTelcom with 9%, Movicel with 6%, and Startel with 3%. Its director is António Nunes. Angola Telecom is one of twelve companies making up the WACS consortium.

Angola Cable's landing station, built for US$650 Million for the WACS cable at Sangano, about 15 kilometers north of the Cabo Ledo and 120 km south of Angola's capital Luanda, was inaugurated on 29 June 2012. For this inauguration, Angolan musician Bonga, located in Lisbon, Portugal, performed several songs together with a band located at the landing station, linked via the undersea cable.

Services

Angola Cables aims at development of the telecommunications sector in Angola and in Africa. It provides international connectivity to national operators and develops the interconnection between regional operators.

 Internet
The Internet service includes optimization of existing cables and the connection to the WACS, and providing bandwidth and direct access to the national IXP as well as to the major ISPs in the world.

 Colocation
Angola Cables provides physical space and hardware in Telecom environment for network creation and offers 24/7 technical support.

 Circuits
The Circuits service guarantees international interconnection with a variety of options on the operating system's cable network. 
The service integrates the local circuit, backhaul and submarine capacity, allowing for improved international connections.

 Cloud
In July 2019, Angola Cables launched a cloud service that utilizes their cable system connecting Brazil, the US, and Angola.

ANGONIX

The ANGONIX is a physical infrastructure through which Internet service providers (ISPs) exchange Internet traffic between their networks. It acts as a traffic aggregating Hub, where connected clients can share content with other providers that are also connected at this point. The purpose of this infrastructure is to improve Internet services for local customers. Often, geographically neighboring clients need to travel long distances to be able to interconnect, due to the configuration of the network providing them the Internet services. The ANGONIX will minimize these distances for the Angolan Internet users thus improving speed, accessibility and availability at a reduced cost.

Angola’s connection to South America

Angola Cables launched the South Atlantic Cable System (SACS), the first submarine cable directly linking Africa and Latin America.

See also
Telecommunications in Angola
WACS (cable system)
SACS (cable system)

External links
 Angola Cables web site

References

Telecommunications companies of Angola